Still in Love, (2 May 2000 – 2 August 2007) was a Japanese Thoroughbred racehorse and broodmare. After winning her only race as a juvenile she became the best filly of her generation in Japan, winning the Oka Sho, Yushun Himba and Shuka Sho to complete the Japanese Fillies' Triple Crown. She remained in training for two more years but failed to win again and was retired in 2005. She produced only one foal before dying at the age of seven in 2007.

Background
Still in Love was a bay mare bred in Japan by Shimokobe Farm. She was sired by Sunday Silence, who won the 1989 Kentucky Derby, before retiring to stud in Japan where he was champion sire on thirteen consecutive occasions. His other major winners included Deep Impact, Stay Gold, Heart's Cry, Manhattan Cafe, Zenno Rob Roy and Neo Universe.  Still in Love's dam Bradamente was an unraced, Kentucky-bred daughter of Roberto. She was a half-sister to Color of Gold, who produced the Yushun Himba winner Rose Decollete.

During her racing career, Still in Love was owned by North Hills Management Co Ltd and trained by Shigeki Matsumoto. She was ridden in most of her races by Hideaki Miyuki.

Racing career

2002 and 2003: two and three-year-old seasons
On her only appearance as a two-year-old Still in Love won a maiden race over 1400 metres at Hanshin Racecourse on 30 November 2002.

Still in Love began her second season by winning the Kobai Stakes over 1400 metres at Kyoto Racecourse in January and was then moved up in class for the Grade III Tulip Sho at Hanshin in which she finished second of the sixteen runners behind Osumi Haruka. On 13 April Still in Love was one of seventeen fillies to contest the Grade I Oka Sho (the first leg of the Japanese Fillies Triple Crown) over 1600 metres at the same track. She started the 5/2 joint favourite alongside Admire Groove with the best fancied of the other runners being Yamakatsu Lily and Meine Nouvelle. Still in Love won by one and a half lengths from the 50/1 outsider She Is Tosho with Admire Groove half a length away in third. Her winning time of 1:33.9 was a record for the race. The filly was then moved up in distance for the Yushun Himba over 2400 metres at Tokyo Racecourse on 25 May. She added the second leg of the Triple Crown as she won by one and a quarter lengths from Chunyi, with Shinko Ruby raking third ahead of Yamakatsu Lily.

After a break of almost four months Still in Love returned in the Grade II Rose Stakes at Hanshin on 21 September and finished fifth of the twelve runners behind Admire Groove. On 19 October the filly attempted to complete the Triple Crown in the Shuka Sho over 2000 metres at Kyoto Racecourse in which her opponents included Admire Groove, Peace of World (Hanshin Juvenile Fillies), Osumi Haruka, Chunyi, and Yamakatsu Lily. She won by three quarters of a length from Admire Groove with Yamakatsu Lily, Peace of World and Meine Samantha close behind in third, fourth and fifth. On her final appearance of the season, Still in Love was matched against older fillies and mares in the Queen Elizabeth II Commemorative Cup over 2200 metres at Kyoto in November and finished second, beaten a nose by her old rival Admire Groove.

2004 and 2005: later career
In 2004 Still in Love failed to win in five races. In the first part of the season unplaced behind Tap Dance City in the Kinko Sho and the Takarazuka Kinen and then finished twelfth of thirteen in the Grade III Kitakyushu Kinen. In the autumn she finished third to Osumi Haruka in the Grade III Fuchu Himba Stakes and ended the year by running ninth behind Admire Groove in the Queen Elizabeth II Commemorative Cup.

Still in Love remained in training as a five-year-old but made no impact in three starts, finishing unplaced in the Kinko Sho, Takarazuka Kinen and Fuchu Himba Stakes.

Assessment and awards
In January 2004, Still in Love was voted Best Three-Year-Old Filly of 2003 at the JRA Awards.

Breeding record
Still in Love was retired from racing to become a broodmare. She produced only one foal:

Judah, a chestnut colt, foaled in 2007, sired by King Kamehameha. Won two races.

Still in Love became ill in July 2007 from an abdominal complaint. She underwent surgery but failed to recover and died on 2 August 2007 at the age of seven.

Pedigree

 Still in Love was inbred 3 × 3 to Hail To Reason, meaning that this stallion appears twice in the third generation of her pedigree.

See also
 List of historical horses

References 

2000 racehorse births
2007 racehorse deaths
Racehorses bred in Japan
Racehorses trained in Japan
Thoroughbred family 10-d
Triple Crown of Thoroughbred Racing winners